The 2017 Columbus Lions season was the eleventh season for the professional indoor football franchise and first in the National Arena League (NAL). The Lions were one of eight teams that competed in the NAL for its inaugural 2017 season.

Led by head coach Jason Gibson, the Lions played their home games at the Columbus Civic Center.

Standings

Schedule

Regular season
The 2017 regular season schedule was released on December 9, 2016

Key: 

All start times are local time

Post-season

Roster

References

Columbus Lions
Columbus Lions
Columbus Lions